Michał Jacaszek (born 1972) is a Polish electroacoustic musician, often credited on albums simply as Jacaszek.

Discography
Studio albums
 (2004) Lo Fi Stories
 (2005) Lem Konzept
 (2005) Sequel
 (2006) Kompleta
 (2008) Treny (Miasmah)
 (2009) Pentral
 (2011) Glimmer
 (2013) Pieśni
 (2014) Catalogue des Arbres (Touch)
 (2017) KWIATY
 (2020) Music for Film
 (2020) Gardenia
 (2022) It Deel I

Selected works

As composer

Feature films
 Golgota wroclawska by Jan Komasa (2008)
 Suicide Room by Jan Komasa (Iceland, 2011)

Short films
 Mami Fatale: On Tastier Tides by Marcin Wasilewski (Poland, 2012)
 Lost Senses by Marcin Wasilewski (Poland, 2014)
 Fugue for Cello, Trumpet and Landscape by Jerzy Kucia (Poland, 2014)
 The Showing by Jonathan Lang (2014)
 The Followers by Bill Kirstein (2014)

Documentaries
 Walking Under Water by Eliza Kubarska (Poland, 2014)
 The Bad Kids by Keith Fulton & Louis Pepe (USA, 2014)

Television Series
 Mami Fatale (Poland, 2013)

See also 
List of ambient music artists

External links
 Jacaszek.com - Official website
 MySpace

1972 births
Living people
Ambient musicians
Electroacoustic music composers
Experimental musicians
Polish musicians